Zabrus kurdistanicus is a species of ground beetle in the Pelor subgenus that is endemic to Turkey.

References

Beetles described in 1989
Beetles of Asia
Endemic fauna of Turkey
Zabrus